Éric Élisor (born 11 April 1971) is a French former professional footballer who played as a midfielder. He is now a youth football trainer.

References

1971 births
Living people
French footballers
Association football midfielders
FC Istres players
Ligue 2 players
US Pontet Grand Avignon 84 players
Stade Beaucairois players
Trélissac FC players